Qarah Gol (also Romanized as Qareh Gol) is a village in Qezel Gechilu Rural District, in the Central District of Mahneshan County, Zanjan Province, Iran. At the 2006 census its population was reported to be 426 with 113 families.

References 

Populated places in Mahneshan County